Thornfield is a Canadian racehorse.  Thornfield may also refer to:

 Thornfield Township, Ozark County, Missouri, an inactive township
 Thornfield, Missouri, United States, an unincorporated community
 Thornfield Hall, a location in the novel Jane Eyre by Charlotte Bronte
 Tara Thornfield, a character in the British soap opera Emmerdale